This page is a list of the hat-tricks scored for the Romania national football team. Since Romania's first international association football match in 1922, there have been 26 occasions when a Romanian player has scored three or more goals (a hat-trick) in a game. The first hat-trick was scored by Gheorghe Ciolac against Bulgaria in 21 April 1929. The record for the most goals scored in an international game by a Romanian player is five, which has been achieved on just one occasion: by Rudolf Wetzer against Greece in 1930, at the 1929-31 Balkan Cup.

Iuliu Bodola holds the record for the most hat-tricks scored by a Romanian player with three, the first two coming in 1931 in a Friendly against Lithuania and in a Balkan Cup match against Greece, and his third came at the 1936 Friendship Cup in a 3-2 win over Yugoslavia. He is closely followed by the likes of Gheorghe Ciolac, Florin Răducioiu and	Gheorghe Popescu.

Hat-tricks scored by Romania

Hat-tricks conceded by Romania

See also
 Romania national football team results

Notes

References

Hat-tricks
Romania
Romania